Dol pri Hrastovljah is a small village in the City Municipality of Koper in the Littoral region of Slovenia.

Name
The name of the settlement was changed from Dol to Dol pri Hrastovljah in 1953.

Church
The local church is dedicated to Saint John the Evangelist.

References

External links

Dol pri Hrastovljah on Geopedia
Dol pri Hrastovljah on Google Maps

Populated places in the City Municipality of Koper